Hari Shankar Yadav (Born 1 January 1955 )is an Indian politician in Bihar. He was elected as  member of Bihar Legislative Assembly from Raghunathpur in 2015 and 2020 from RJD.

References

Rashtriya Janata Dal politicians
Bihar MLAs 2015–2020
Bihar MLAs 2020–2025
1955 births
Living people